Barykin, feminine: Barykina  is a Russian-language surname. Notable people with the surname include:

Alexander Barykin (1952-2011), Soviet and Russian singer and songwriter
Mariya Barykina (born 1973), Russian ice hockey player
Vladimir Barykin (1879-1939), Russian microbiologist and epidemiologist

Russian-language surnames